William (Bill) H.  Vernon, Sr. (June 29, 1944 - March 10, 2014) was an American businessman and politician.

Born in Odessa, Delaware, he grew up in Rehoboth Beach, Delaware. He graduated from Rehoboth High School and  Georgia Institute of Technology. Vernon then served in the United States Coast Guard which included a tour of duty in Vietnam. Vernon owned Vernon Real Estate and later became a V.P. with Coldwell Banker. He served in the Delaware House of Representatives from 1977 to 1981 as a Republican.

Notes

1944 births
2014 deaths
People from Odessa, Delaware
Georgia Tech alumni
Businesspeople from Delaware
Republican Party members of the Delaware House of Representatives
People from Rehoboth Beach, Delaware
20th-century American businesspeople